Hong Kong Taoist Association is a Taoist organisation in Hong Kong. It promotes Taoism in Hong Kong and provides a series of charity services in Hong Kong, including education, medical, child care, youth activities, elderly care.

In November 2017 it organised a Taoist Festival that took over most of a popular public space, Western District Public Cargo Area, when no clear process for the application was in place, but with the stated support of the Chinese Communist Party's United Front Work Department.

See also
 Taoism in Hong Kong
 Hong Kong Taoist Association Tang Hin Memorial Secondary School
 Hong Kong Taoist Association The Yuen Yuen Institute No.2 Secondary School
 Election Committee

References

External links
Official website 

Charities based in Hong Kong
Taoism in Hong Kong
Taoist organizations